International operator services (IOS) allow travelers to place an international call using a live telephone operator who speaks their language and accepts all forms of payment for connecting the call from anywhere in the world, to anywhere in the world. This specialty form of operator services uses collect call billing as well as credit card billing to allow callers to place calls without a calling card or without the correct change for the pay telephone.

See also
 Long-distance operator

International telecommunications
Telephone services